"Out of Our Hands" is a song written by Irish singer-songwriter Gemma Hayes for her third album The Hollow of Morning. It was released digitally on 2 May 2008 as the album's first single. The single went to #6 in the official Top 40 Irish Singles chart.

Music video
No music video was shot for 'Out of Our Hands', despite being the album's lead single. However, the second single released from the album, Home, did receive video treatment.

Popular culture
Her song 'Out of Our Hands' was featured in ER episode "T-Minus-6" (from Season 15) which aired on 26 February 2009 on NBC and 10 May 2009 on RTÉ One.
The song later appeared in US TV series the Vampire Diaries. It featured in episode 1 ('The Return') of season 2 which aired on 9 September 2010 on The CW.

Release history

References

Gemma Hayes songs
2008 singles
2008 songs
Songs written by Gemma Hayes